Rapdalus is a genus of moths in the family Cossidae.

Species
 Rapdalus albicolor Yakovlev, 2006
 Rapdalus kapuri (Arora, 1976)
 Rapdalus pardicolor (Moore, 1879) (=Duomitus pardalis Dudgeon, 1899)

References

 , 2004: Cossidae of Thailand. Part 1. (Lepidoptera: Cossidae). Atalanta 35 (3-4): 335-351.
 , 2006: New Cossidae (Lepidoptera) from Asia, Africa and Macronesia, Tinea 19 (3): 188-213.

External links
Natural History Museum Lepidoptera generic names catalog

Zeuzerinae